Viretta Park is a  park in the Denny-Blaine neighborhood of Seattle, Washington, located at the foot of E. John Street at 39th Avenue E. and stretching down to Lake Washington Boulevard. It was named by Charles L. Denny after his wife, Viretta Chambers Denny. It is located to the south of the former home of Kurt Cobain, where he was found dead. Nirvana fans gather at the park on the anniversary of Cobain's death (April 5), and to a lesser extent on his birthday (February 20), to pay tribute to him.

Kurt Cobain Memorial

The park's wooden benches, serving as the de facto memorial to Kurt Cobain in Seattle, are covered with graffiti messages to the rock icon. There has been much speculation over the years on whether the name of the park should be changed to "Kurt's Park", due to the late rock icon's large fan base.

Howard Schultz controversy

The first version of the group Friends of Viretta Park was formed by area neighbors during a dispute with former neighbor and Starbucks CEO Howard Schultz, who formerly lived to the South. Schultz later moved to a new residence.

Viretta Park Repair

In 2010 a group known as Viretta Park Repair was formed; according to its website its purpose was "to repair and restore Seattle's Viretta Park and... create a memorial for Nirvana's singer/songwriter Kurt Cobain who died next door to the park".  Its first work party was scheduled to take place on Kurt Cobain's 44th birthday on February 20, 2011. Volunteers came from all over the Western United States and Southwestern Canada. The next series of scheduled work parties, scheduled for March 13, 2011 and April 5, 2011, were shut down by Seattle Parks and Recreation Superintendent Christopher Williams after a neighbor complained about memorial events - and a sculpture - that did not exist, but which were actually scheduled for Aberdeen, Washington.

Acting Parks Chief Christopher Williams sided with the neighbors in blocking any attempt to have any memorial to Kurt Cobain in the park, despite recent additions to Jimi Hendrix Park in Seattle and a memorial sculpture in Aberdeen, Washington which had the approval of Aberdeen's Mayor.

Since then Viretta Park Repair has been given the green light to hold additional work parties.  A second work party was held on June 4, 2011 where volunteers removed invasive holly and blackberry bushes, laid burlap and covered the area with bark mulch.

See also
Kurt Cobain Memorial Park, in Aberdeen, Washington

Further reading

Howard Schultz Controversy
The Neighbors and Friends of Viretta Park, an unincorporated voluntary association 
The Seattle Times Letters: Viretta Park -- Parks Staff Deserves Praise April 4, 1994
Seattle Post-Intelligencer VIRETTA PARK NEIGHBORS CITE MORE ENCROACHMENT PUBLIC BACK YARD, By Mark Higgins, March 14, 1996.
Seattle Post-Intelligencer: Letters To The Editor, Viretta Pak -- Site Was Used As A Play Area April 10, 1996
The Seattle Times: Viretta Driveway OK But Decoration Must Go By Daryl Strickland May 21, 1994

Viretta Park Repair
Seattle Post-Intelligencer: Nirvana fans plan to do Seattle park work Sunday Posted by Casey McNerthney on February 15, 2011 
KING-TV Nirvana fans plan to restore park close to Cobain's former home Posted on February 18, 2011 
The Oregonian Kurt Cobain fans restoring park near Seattle home Published: Friday, February 18, 2011
Nirvana fans plan to restore park close to Cobain's former home updated 2/18/2011 
MYNorthwest.com Kurt Cobain fans restoring park near Seattle home Updated Feb 18, 2011
Kurt Cobain fans restoring park near Seattle home
The Seattle Times Memorial for Kurt Cobain sought; park neighbors opposed By Nicole Brodeur, Seattle Times staff columnist, Originally published Monday, February 21, 2011 
Seattle Weekly Nirvana Fans Hosting a Reunion/Workparty at Viretta Park on Sunday, What Would Have Been Kurt Cobain's 44th Birthday By Chris Kornelis, Feb. 18 2011

External links
Viretta Park (Seattle) at HistoryLink
Seattle Department of Parks and Recreation
https://web.archive.org/web/20060927131251/http://www.seattle.gov/parks/history/VirettaPk.pdf
Seattle PI article with pictures of bench at Viretta Park and house to the North

Parks in Seattle